Bajura Airport  is a domestic airport located in Budhinanda serving Bajura District, a district in Sudurpashchim Province in Nepal.

Facilities

Airlines and destinations

Incidents and accidents
 On 30 May 2017, a Nepalese Army Air Service PZL M28 Skytruck crashed at Bajura Airport while its pilot was trying to land the aircraft. The cargo airplane was supposed to land at Simikot Airport in Humla district. However, bad weather condition forced the pilot to divert towards Bajura. The pilot of the aircraft died while two others were injured.

See also
 List of airports in Nepal

References

External links
 

Airports in Nepal
Buildings and structures in Bajura District